Willem (or Guilliam) Ogier (1618–1689) was a Flemish schoolmaster, playwright and comedian.

Life
Guilliam Ogier was born in Antwerp in 1618 but brought up in Amsterdam. He returned to Antwerp after his father's death. He registered with the schoolmasters' guild in 1644, becoming dean of the guild during the 1650s. He wrote comedic moralities for performance by the chambers of rhetoric (civic poetry and drama societies) the Violieren and the Olijftak. First performances were often on the Feast of St Luke (18 October), as the rhetoricians had a close association with the Guild of Saint Luke (the guild of painters, illuminators, printmakers and booksellers). When the Olyftack and Violieren merged in 1660 Ogier took a leading role as "Factor" of the reinstituted chamber. He died in Antwerp on 22 February 1689.

Plays
 Droncken Heyn (Drunken Harry), first performed by the Olyftack on 18 October 1639
 De hooveerdigheydt (Pride), first performed by the Violieren on 18 October 1644
 De gramschap (Anger), first performed by the Violieren on 18 October 1645
 De onkuysheydt (Unchastity), first performed by the Violieren on 18 October 1646
 Den haet en nydt (Hatred and envy), first performed by the Violieren on 18 October 1647 (text of the Amsterdam performance, 1671, available on Google Books)
 De traegheydt (Sloth), first performed by the Olyftack on 18 October 1677
 De gierigheydt (Miserliness), first performed by the Olyftack on 18 February 1678
 Belachelijk misverstant ofte boere geck (Ludicrous misunderstanding or country bumpkin), first performed by the Olyftack on 18 October 1680

Publication
Ogier's seven moralities were collected for publication as De seven hooft-sonden (The seven deadly sins) in 1682, with Droncken Heyn reworked as De Gulsigheydt (Gluttony).

A critical edition of his plays was edited by Willem van Eeghem and A.A. Keersmaekers and published in three volumes as Willem Ogier: De tooneelwerken (Antwerp and Amsterdam, 1921–1955).

References

Studies
 August Snieders, "Lezing: Willem Ogier en zijn tijd", Verslagen en mededelingen van de Koninklijke Vlaamse Academie voor Taal- en Letterkunde (1888): 70–86.

17th-century writers
Educators of the Spanish Netherlands
Writers from Antwerp
Flemish educators
1618 births
1689 deaths